During the 1988–89 English football season, Everton F.C. competed in the Football League First Division.

Everton finished eighth in the table with 54 points after a disappointing season in the league, where they failed to mount a title challenge.

The Toffees were the runners-up in the FA Cup, losing to Liverpool in a Merseyside final at Wembley Stadium and advanced to the 4th round of the League Cup.

Before the start of the season, Everton became the first English club to pay a £2million fee when signing West Ham striker Tony Cottee.

Final League Table

Results

Legend

Football League First Division

FA Cup

League Cup

Simod Cup

Mercantile Credit Football League Centenary Trophy

References

Everton F.C. seasons
Everton
Everton F.C. season